Camille Bouvagne (born Jean-Baptiste Camille Bouvagne) (1864–1936) was a French painter from Lyon, France. A member of the Lyon School (L'École de Lyon or École lyonnaise), Bouvagne exhibited regularly at the Le Salon in Lyon (Salon de la Société Lyonnaise des Beaux-Arts).

Œuvre
Bouvagne, a keen observer of nature, specialized in landscape and still life painting. His style remains split between classical Impressionism and Post-Impressionism; thin, relatively small, yet visible brush strokes, exhibiting an accurate depiction of light and colors that took precedence over lines and contours. Following the example of painters such as Jean-Baptiste-Camille Corot, Bouvagne's palette is restrained, dominated by browns, blacks and silvery green, his brushstrokes carefully controlled.

Career
Camille Bouvagne studied at the École des Beaux-Arts de Lyon (École nationale des beaux-arts de Lyon) under Pierre Miciol (French, 1833–1905), who was a former student of the French academic painter Jehan Georges Vibert (1840–1902) and the first co-president of the Société Lyonnaise des Beaux Arts.

Selected exhibitions and works
Le Salon, 1914, Lyon (Salon de la Société Lyonnaise des Beaux-Arts)
 Chrysanthèmes jaunes. Purchased by the Société des Anciens Elèves de l'Ecole des Beaux-Arts

Le Salon, 1909, Lyon
 les Cerises (n. 116)
 les Pêches (n. 117)

Le Salon, 1906 (Lyon)
 Faisan, nature mort (n. 92)
 Raisins (n. 93). Purchase by the Société des anciens élèves de l'École des Beaux-Arts

Le Salon, 1904 (Lyon)
 Gibiers (n. 86)

Le Salon, 1903 (Lyon)
Nature morte (n. 84). Purchased by La Ville de Lyon

Le Salon, 1900 (Lyon)
  Fleurs et fruits (n. 91)

Salon de Bellecour, 25 February 1889, Société Lyonnaise des Beaux-Arts
 Nature morte
 Perdrix et choux

Le Salon, April 1899 (Lyon)
 Perdrix et choux (n. 116)
 Sans titre, untitled (n. 117)

Le Salon, 1898 (Lyon)
 Les condamnés à mort (n. 120)
 Gibier (n. 121)

Gallery

References

External links

 Le Passe-temps, littérature, beaux-arts, musique, biographies, nouvelles lieu d'édition: Lyon (pdf)

1864 births
1936 deaths
Artists from Lyon
French landscape painters
Impressionist artists
Modern painters
Realist artists
19th-century French painters
French male painters
20th-century French painters
19th-century French male artists